The 2003–04 Boston College Eagles men's basketball team represented Boston College as a member of the Big East Conference during the 2003–04 NCAA Division I men's basketball season. Led by head coach Al Skinner, they played their home games at Conte Forum in Chestnut Hill, Massachusetts. The team finished 5th in the Big East regular season standings, reached the semifinals of the Big East tournament, and received an at-large bid to the NCAA tournament. Playing as the No. 6 seed in the St. Louis region, the Eagles defeated  in the opening round before losing 57–54 to eventual National runner-up Georgia Tech in the second round. Boston College finished the season with a 24–10 (10–6 Big East) record and a No. 25 ranking in the AP poll.

Roster

Schedule and results 

|-
!colspan=9 style=| Regular season

|-
!colspan=9 style=| Big East tournament

|-
!colspan=9 style=| NCAA Tournament

Rankings

References

Boston College Eagles men's basketball seasons
Boston College
Boston College
Boston College Eagles men's basketball
Boston College Eagles men's basketball
Boston College Eagles men's basketball
Boston College Eagles men's basketball